Avery Ng Man-yuen (born 27 December 1976) is a Hong Kong politician and social activist. He is the chairman of the League of Social Democrats (LSD), a pro-democracy radical social democratic party in Hong Kong.

Biography
Ng was born in Hong Kong on 27 December 1976 and raised in Sham Shui Po, a poor neighbourhood in Hong Kong. His father, who once was a sailor, made his fortune by starting his own business. He migrated to New Zealand with his family when he was 13, studying at the Auckland Grammar School and the University of Melbourne in Australia with double degrees of Mechanical Engineering and Actuarial Studies. He also studied for a Master of Business Administration at the London Business School in 2003, but returned to Australia as a strategy consultant before he finished the degree.

Ng returned to Hong Kong in 2008 during the 2008 Legislative Council election. Angered by the pro-Beijing dominance, Ng joined the pro-democracy radical social democratic party, the League of Social Democrats (LSD) in 2009. He has been active in social activism and protests since then and has been arrested and charged. In the 2012 Legislative Council election, he surrendered his Australian and New Zealand citizenships in order to run in the Hong Kong Island constituency. He received 3,169 votes, about one percent of the popular votes and was not elected.

He had been vice-chairman of the LSD since 2010. In February 2016, he was elected the chairman of the LSD, succeeding legislator "Longhair" Leung Kwok-hung.

In May 2018, Ng was convicted and sentenced to four months in jail over three counts of revealing the identity of a government official. In 2016, he had disclosed to broadcaster RTHK and on social media that Betty Fung Ching Suk-yee, Permanent Secretary of the Home Affairs Bureau was the subject of an investigation by the Independent Commission Against Corruption. He was released on bail after sentencing. In December 2019, a High Court judge severely criticized Ng for what she said were his "shameless" attempts at dragging out his appeal against the jail sentence. Ng received a further extension of bail for a month. 

On 18 April 2020, Ng was one of the 15 high-profile Hong Kong democracy figures arrested that day. According to the police statement, his arrest was based on suspicion of organizing, publicizing or taking part in several unauthorized assemblies between August and October 2019 during the anti-extradition bill protests.

On 18 May 2021, Ng was remanded in custody by District Judge Amanda Woodcock, over his participation in an unauthorised assembly in 2019. Ng accused the judicial system of persecution and argued that the justice in Hong Kong had been "weaponized" to target pro-democracy figures. About the future of his League of Social Democrats party, he said that they have inside cautious optimism but pointed out an "uncertain" future under the national security law and with its two vice chairmen (Leung Kwok-hung and Jimmy Sham) awaiting trial for subversion.

On 28 May 2021, Ng was sentenced to 14 months' imprisonment over the unauthorised assembly, remanding him in custody, after a suspended 2019 sentence was automatically activated.

References

1976 births
Living people
League of Social Democrats politicians
Hong Kong emigrants to New Zealand
University of Melbourne alumni
People educated at Auckland Grammar School
Hong Kong democracy activists
Prisoners and detainees of Hong Kong
Hong Kong political prisoners